Agbo is a surname. People with this surname include:
 Jerome Agbo
 Hans Agbo (born 1967), Cameroonian footballer
Alex Agbo (born 1977), Nigerian footballer
 Fofo Agbo (born 1979),  Ghanaian-born Hong Kong footballer 
Agoli-agbo (ruled 1894-1900), last King of Dahomey
Berte-Evelyne Agbo, Beninese/Senegalese novelist
Eddy Agbo, Nigerian molecular biologist

See also
Agboville, town in Côte d'Ivoire